Stary Rusinów  is a village in the administrative district of Gmina Majdan Królewski, within Kolbuszowa County, Subcarpathian Voivodeship, in southeastern Poland.

The village has a population of 250.

References

Villages in Kolbuszowa County